{{DISPLAYTITLE:C20H21F3N2O2}}
The molecular formula C20H21F3N2O2 (molar mass: 378.387 g/mol) may refer to:

 EPPTB
 Tilapertin

Molecular formulas